A statue of Founding Father and United States president Thomas Jefferson is installed in Hempstead, New York. The memorial was relocated in June 2020 to the Hofstra University Museum.

See also
 List of statues of Thomas Jefferson
 List of monuments and memorials removed during the George Floyd protests

References

Monuments and memorials in New York (state)
Monuments and memorials removed during the George Floyd protests
Sculptures of men in New York (state)
Statues in New York (state)
Hempstead, New York
Statues removed in 2020
Hofstra University
United States Declaration of Independence in art